The legislative districts of Negros Occidental are the representations of the province of Negros Occidental in the various national legislatures of the Philippines. The province is currently represented in the lower house of the Congress of the Philippines through its first, second, third, fourth, fifth, and sixth congressional districts.

History 
In 1899, the cities and pueblos of San Carlos, Calatrava, Escalante, Sagay, Cadiz, Manapla, Victorias, and Saravia shall compose the first district. From General Order No. 30, from Office US Military Governor in the Philippine Islands, Manila, P.I. July 22, 1899.

Negros Occidental was divided into three legislative districts from 1907 to 1972, it was redistricted into six legislative districts in 1986. It was part of the representation of Region VI from 1978 to 1984, and from 1984 to 1986 it elected 7 assemblymen at-large. Until 1986, Bacolod was part of its representation.

1st District 

Cities: Escalante (became city 2001), San Carlos
Municipalities: Calatrava, Salvador Benedicto, Toboso
Population (2020): 381,716

1907–1972 
Municipalities: Cadiz (became city 1967), Enrique B. Magalona (Saravia), Escalante, Manapla, Sagay, San Carlos (became city 1960), Silay (became city 1957), Victorias, Calatrava (established 1924), Toboso (established 1948)

Notes

2nd District 

Cities: Cadiz, Sagay (became city 1996)
Municipality: Manapla 
Population (2020): 362,521

1907–1972 
Municipalities: Bacolod (became city 1938), Bago (became city 1966), La Carlota (became city 1965), Murcia, Talisay, Valladolid, Pulupandan (re-established 1916), San Enrique (re-established 1918)

3rd District 

Cities: Silay, Talisay (became city 1998), Victorias (became city 1998)
Municipalities: Enrique B. Magalona, Murcia
Population (2020): 482,646

1907–1972 
Municipalities: Binalbagan, Cauayan, Himamaylan, Hinigaran, Ilog, Isabela, Kabankalan, Pontevedra, La Castellana (re-established 1917), Sipalay (established 1948), Hinoba-an (Asia) (established 1948), Moises Padilla (Magallon) (established 1958), Candoni (established 1958)

4th District 

Cities: Bago, La Carlota
Municipalities: Pontevedra, Pulupandan, San Enrique, Valladolid
Population (2020): 406,666

5th District 

City: Himamaylan (became city 2001)
Municipalities: Binalbagan, Hinigaran, Isabela, La Castellana, Moises Padilla
Population (2020): 464,026

Notes

6th District 

Cities: Kabankalan (became city 1997), Sipalay (became city 2001)
Municipalities: Candoni, Cauayan, Hinoba-an, Ilog
Population (2020): 525,597

At-Large (defunct)

1943-1944 
 Excludes Bacolod

1984-1986 
Includes Bacolod

See also 
Legislative district of Bacolod

References 

Negros Occidental
Politics of Negros Occidental